Yannick Ndzoumou (born 18 May 1996) is a Cameroonian professional footballer who plays as a centre-back for Diósgyőri VTK.

Career statistics

References

1996 births
Living people
People from Yaoundé
Cameroonian footballers
Association football defenders
Diósgyőri VTK players
Nemzeti Bajnokság I players
Cameroonian expatriate footballers
Expatriate footballers in Hungary
Cameroonian expatriate sportspeople in Hungary